William Conroy may refer to:
Bill Conroy (catcher) (1915–1997), Major League Baseball catcher
Bill Conroy (infielder) (1899–1970), Major League Baseball infielder 
Will Conroy (born 1982), American basketball player
William Conroy (murderer) (1857–1887), last person to be hanged at the Perth Gaol
William Jackson Conroy (1849–1915), miller, farmer and politician in Quebec